Frasquita is a 1934 Austrian musical film directed by Karel Lamač and starring Jarmila Novotná, Charlott Daudert, and Heinz Rühmann. An operetta film, it is an adaptation of Franz Lehár's 1922 stage work of the same name. It was shot at the Sievering Studios in Vienna and on location in Sicily. The film's sets were designed by the art director Julius von Borsody.

Cast
 Jarmila Novotná as Frasquita, the Gypsy singer
 Hans-Heinz Bollmann as Harald, the would-be groom
 Heinz Rühmann as Hippolit, his best man
 Charlott Daudert as Dolly
 Rudolf Carl as Karel, the butler
 Hans Moser as Jaromir – Harald's Valet
 Max Gülstorff as Graf Elemer
 Franz Schafheitlin as Juan – Frasquita's Gypsy Lover
 Franz Lehár as Conductor in credits sequence
 Choir of the Vienna State Opera as Singers
 Otto Schmöle
 Robert Valberg
 Gretl Wawra
 Wiener Sängerknaben as Themselves – Singers

References

Bibliography 
Heinz Rühmann und seine Filme. Goldmann, 1982.

External links 
 

1934 films
1934 musical comedy films
Austrian musical comedy films
1930s German-language films
Films directed by Karel Lamač
Films based on operettas
Operetta films
Films shot at Sievering Studios
Films shot in Italy
Fictional representations of Romani people
Austrian black-and-white films